Postal codes in Vietnam have five digits.

The exact postal code designated for local government areas, local post offices, government offices or embassies and consulates can be searched on National Postal Code Website.

References

External links
VNpost - Post Office & Postal Code Location Service

Communications in Vietnam
Vietnam
Vietnam geography-related lists